The men's triples competition began on 4 October 2010. and finished on 10 October 2010. The gold medal was won by South Africa who won the final over Australia after a tie-break. The bronze medal was won by England, who only lost one match all tournament.

Results

Qualifying – round robin

Section A

Section B

Jersey won 5 sets with a shot difference of -43 to finish ahead of Papua New Guinea who won 5 sets with a shot difference of -79.

Knockout stages

See also
Lawn bowls at the 2010 Commonwealth Games

References

2010 in bowls
Lawn bowls at the 2010 Commonwealth Games